Uzur Dzhuzupbekov (born 12 April 1996) is a Kyrgyzstani Greco-Roman wrestler. He won the gold medal in the men's 97 kg event at the 2019 Asian Wrestling Championships held in Xi'an, China. He is also a bronze medalist at the Asian Games and a two-time silver medalist at the Islamic Solidarity Games. He represented Kyrgyzstan at the 2020 Summer Olympics in Tokyo, Japan.

Career 

At the 2016 Asian Wrestling Championships held in Bangkok, Thailand, he won one of the bronze medals in the men's 98 kg event.

In 2017, he won the silver medal in the men's 98 kg event at the Islamic Solidarity Games in Baku, Azerbaijan. A few months later, at the 2017 Asian Indoor and Martial Arts Games held in Ashgabat, Turkmenistan, he also won the silver medal in the 98 kg event. In that same year, he also competed in the 98 kg event at the 2017 World Wrestling Championships in Paris, France. He lost his first match against Musa Evloev of Russia and in the repechage he lost his match against Balázs Kiss of Hungary.

At the 2018 Asian Wrestling Championships held in Bishkek, Kyrgyzstan, he won one of the bronze medals in the men's 97 kg event. In that same year, he won one of the bronze medals in the men's 97 kg event at the 2018 Asian Games held in Jakarta, Indonesia. In his bronze medal match he defeated Jahongir Turdiev of Uzbekistan.

In 2019, he competed in the 97 kg event at the World Wrestling Championships held in Nur-Sultan, Kazakhstan. He did not advance far as he was eliminated from the competition in his first match, against Cenk İldem of Turkey. In 2020, he competed in the men's 97 kg event at the Individual Wrestling World Cup held in Belgrade, Serbia.

He competed in the 97 kg event at the 2020 Summer Olympics held in Tokyo, Japan. He lost his first match against Artur Aleksanyan of Armenia and he was then eliminated in the repechage by Arvi Savolainen of Finland.

In 2022, he won one of the bronze medals in the 97 kg event at the Dan Kolov & Nikola Petrov Tournament held in Veliko Tarnovo, Bulgaria. He won the silver medal in his event at the 2021 Islamic Solidarity Games held in Konya, Turkey.

Achievements

References

External links 
 
 
 

1996 births
Living people
Sportspeople from Bishkek
Kyrgyzstani male sport wrestlers
Asian Games medalists in wrestling
Wrestlers at the 2018 Asian Games
Asian Games bronze medalists for Kyrgyzstan
Medalists at the 2018 Asian Games
Islamic Solidarity Games medalists in wrestling
Islamic Solidarity Games competitors for Kyrgyzstan
Wrestlers at the 2020 Summer Olympics
Olympic wrestlers of Kyrgyzstan
Asian Wrestling Championships medalists
21st-century Kyrgyzstani people